Henry FitzHerbert may refer to:
 Henry FitzHerbert (priest) (1882–1958), Archdeacon of Derby
 Henry FitzHerbert, 3rd Baronet of the Fitzherbert baronets
 Henry Samuel Fitzherbert (1851–1912), Member of Parliament in Wellington, New Zealand

See also
 Henry FitzHerbert Wright (1870–1947), English cricketer, lawyer and Conservative politician